The Scream Tour IV (also referred to as Scream Tour IV: The HeartThrobs) was a summer 2005 concert tour featuring Bow Wow, Omarion, Marques Houston, B5, Pretty Ricky and Bobby Valentino. It was an installment in the Scream Tour series, sponsored by BET. Performances by Pretty Ricky were considered by many online critics to be oversexualized, with the members in erotic positions and during some performances in their underwear. Footage from this show was filmed and released on DVD as a live album titled Scream Tour IV: Hearthrobs Live.

Tour dates

References

External links
 Scream tour official website

2005 concert tours